Dystasia sibuyana is a species of beetle in the family Cerambycidae. It was described by Per Olof Christopher Aurivillius in 1927. It is known from Malaysia, the Philippines and Borneo.

References

Pteropliini
Beetles described in 1927